The Jaffa Opera House, at 100–116 W. Main St. in Trinidad, Colorado, was built in 1883. It was listed on the National Register of Historic Places in 1972.

It is Italianate, in fact High Victorian Italianate, in style. The first floor provided commercial spaces; the second floor provided a 710-seat opera house with a  stage and a  proscenium.

When listed in 1972, the main commercial space had been Hausman Drug Store for many years. Photo in 2012 and Google Streetview dated May 2018 show it apparently vacant. It was damaged in an earthquake measured at 3.5 on the Richter magnitude scale, and some experts recommended its demolition in 2011, but a community coalesced in opposition to that. A renovation project scheduled to be completed in 2019 was planned.

It is included as a contributing building in the Corazon de Trinidad historic district, National Register-listed in 1973.

References

External links

Opera houses on the National Register of Historic Places in Colorado
Former theatres in the United States
National Register of Historic Places in Las Animas County, Colorado
Buildings and structures completed in 1883